Bouck's Falls is located in the town of Fulton in Schoharie County, New York. This  waterfall is named after the family of former New York Governor William C. Bouck.
The waterfall and surrounding lands and waterways are now under Kanien’kehá:ka (Mohawk) ownership. In April 2020, the waterfall was recognized as a sacred site by the NYS Government.

History 

The region around Bouck's Falls was settled by the British Crown in the early seventeenth century. During this time, the area was considered part of Albany County.

A house was built near the falls in 1856.

Today 

The waterfall is on private property

References

Waterfalls of New York (state)
Landforms of Schoharie County, New York
Tourist attractions in Schoharie County, New York